In a Major Way is the second studio album by American rapper E-40, released March 14, 1995 on Jive and Sick Wid It Records. It peaked at number 2 on the Billboard Top R&B/Hip-Hop Albums and at number 13 on the Billboard 200, selling 70,000 copies in its first week. The album is certified Platinum by the RIAA.

The album features production by Funk Daddy, Kevin Gardner, Mike Mosley, Eugenius, Sam Bostic and Studio Ton. It also features guest performances by fellow members of The Click: B-Legit and Suga-T, as well as 2Pac, Mac Shawn, Spice 1, Celly Cel, Mac Mall, and his son Droop-E (credited as Lil E).

Music Videos
Three music videos were produced to promote the album, including "Dusted 'n' Disgusted", which features rap verses from E-40 with Spice 1, Mac Mall and Celly Cel. The chorus features vocals from Levitti and Suga-T. Celly Cel's verse replaces 2Pac's in the video version of the song as 2Pac was in jail at the time of filming. Richie Rich makes a cameo appearance and says a few words in the early part of the video and is seen wearing a T-shirt that clearly reads: "Free 2Pac". B-Legit, D-Shot, JT The Bigga Figga, Captain Save 'Em and Funk Mobb also make cameo appearances in the video.

Along with singles, music videos were also produced for the songs: "1-Luv", featuring Levitti, and "Sprinkle Me", featuring Suga-T.

Track listing

Charts

Weekly charts

Year-end charts

References

E-40 albums
1995 albums
Albums produced by Studio Ton
Jive Records albums
Sick Wid It Records albums